The caves in the Maros-Pangkep karst are situated in South Sulawesi, Indonesia, and contain paintings from the Paleolithic considered to be the earliest figurative art in the world, dated to at least 43,900 years ago.

Description 
The caves in the Maros-Pangkep karst are a cave complex, where prehistoric finds were made. The whole complex is also called "Prehistoric place Leang-Leang" – the name stems from the Makassarese language. The various caves - named Pettae, Jane, Saripa, Jarie, Karrasa, and so on - consist of limestone.

A hand stencil in the Leang Tempuseng cave was dated to at least 39,900 years old in a 2014 study. The depiction of a babirusa is also located in this cave. It is estimated to be 35,400 years old. The art works were examined with the help of the Uranium-Thorium method of the sintering on the paintings.

Inside the entrance of the Pettakare cave, on the roof, are 26 red and white hand prints, they are not dated, yet. Primitive stencils of human hands, the white prints were executed by "placing the hand up against the wall and then blowing a mixture of red ochre and water around them, leaving a negative image on the rock". The red hand prints could have been produced by immersing the hand in a solution tinted red from "chewed-up foliage". The hand prints face both left and right. Some are missing a thumb; it was common practice to cut off a finger when an elder died. According to an official with the Makassar Center for Cultural and Heritage Preservation, the palm of the hand was believed to have power to ward off "evil forces and wild animals", thus protecting the people who lived inside the cave. In addition to the hand prints, a roughly half-meter (two-foot) long painting of a red hog deer is in the middle.

Pettakare cave's large room has several small niches, presumed to have been sleeping places for the people who lived there. The cave has a temperature of  during the daytime.

On a rock wall in the cave of Leang Bulu’ Sipong (near Pangkep) representations of several animals and mixed animal-human beings (therianthropes) were found. A dark red pigment was used. In one scene several small humanoid figures (4 to 8 cm long) are connected with ropes or spears to a large anoa (74 by 29 cm). The paintings were examined by uranium series dating of the overlying speleothems. The age of the paintings is said to be at least 43,900 years. According to Aubert, it is the oldest figurative work of art in the world and also the oldest hunting scene in prehistoric art. The wall paintings discovered by Pak Hamrullah in 2017 were dated and described in more detail by the research team around Maxime Aubert in 2019.

In 2021, an image of a roughly life-size Celebes warty pig (Sus celebensis, also called Sulawesi warty pig or Sulawesi pig) in Leang Tedongnge Cave was dated to be at least 45,500 years old, making it currently the oldest known cave painting in the world.

History 
The caves have been known and used by the local people for a long time. Dutch archaeologists began digging at nearby caves during the 1950s, but Pettakare cave was first examined by British archaeologist Ian Glover in 1973.

Scientific examinations conducted in 2011 estimated that the hand stencils and animal painting on the walls were between 35,000 and 40,000 years old. The age of the paintings was estimated through analysis of small radioactive traces of uranium isotopes present in the crust that had accumulated on top of the paintings. The hand paintings are at least as old as cave paintings in Europe, such as those at the Cave of El Castillo (Spain) and Gorham's Cave (Gibraltar).

In October 2014, the Indonesian government promised to "step up" the protection of ancient cave paintings, and announced plans to place all the caves in Sulawesi on the nation's official "cultural heritage" list, as well as apply for inclusion on UNESCO's list of World Heritage Sites.

See also

 History of Painting
 Indonesian art

References

Further reading

Maxime Aubert, Rustan Lebe, Adhi Agus Oktaviana, Muhammad Tang, Basran Burhan, Hamrullah, Andi Jusdi, Abdullah, Budianto Hakim, Jian-xin Zhao, I. Made Geria, Priyatno Hadi Sulistyarto, Ratno Sardi & Adam Brumm (2019): Earliest hunting scene in prehistoric art. Nature, 576: 442–445.

Caves of Indonesia
Rock art in Asia
Prehistoric art